Nagapuri may refer to places in India:

Nagapur, a town in Maharashtra 
Nagpur, a city in Maharashtra